Cochlespira zanzibarica is a species of sea snail, a marine gastropod mollusk in the family Cochlespiridae.

Description
The length of the shell attains 16.9 mm, its diameter 6.9 mm.

Distribution
This species occurs in the Indian Ocean off Zanzibar and Madagascar.

References

External links
 A. Sysoev, Deep-sea conoidean gastropods collected by the John Murray expedition, 1933–34; Bulletin of the Natural Museum of History v.62 no. 1 (1996)
 Specimen at the MNHN, Paris

zanzibarica
Gastropods described in 1996